The Scientific and Cultural Facilities District (SCFD) is a special regional tax district of the State of Colorado that provides funding for art, music, theater, dance, zoology, botany, natural history, or cultural history organizations in the Denver Metropolitan Area.

In 1988, voters in the Denver region created the SCFD to provide a consistent source of unrestricted funding to scientific and cultural organizations. The SCFD is funded by a 0.1% sales and use tax that provided funding to 240 organizations in 2015.

The district comprises seven counties in the Denver Metropolitan Area: Adams, Arapahoe, Boulder, Broomfield, Denver, Douglas, and Jefferson.

Every twelve years, voters in the district decide whether to renew the district or to dissolve it. Most recently, in 2016 voters opted to renew the district for the period 2018 to 2030.

See also

Topic overview:
Colorado
Outline of Colorado
Index of Colorado-related articles

References

External links
Scientific and Cultural Facilities District website

State agencies of Colorado
Colorado culture
Denver metropolitan area
Special administrative structures in the United States